Yarra Valley Water is the largest of three Victorian Government owned retail water corporations that provides drinking water and sewerage services to over two million people and over 58,000 businesses in the northern and eastern suburbs of Melbourne. The water distributed by Yarra Valley Water is supplied by Melbourne Water, as is the infrastructure. Oversight is provided by the Department of Environment, Land, Water and Planning. 

Yarra Valley Water's district covers approximately 4,000 square kilometres from as far north as Wallan and extending to Warburton in the east. Yarra Valley Water owns and maintains over 10,000 km of water mains and over 9,800 km of sewer mains. 

Yarra Valley Water's activities are overseen by an independent Board of Directors appointed by the Victorian Government. Yarra Valley Water's head office is situated in Mitcham and employs around 600 staff.

References

External links

Water companies of Victoria (Australia)
Government agencies established in 1995
Government-owned companies of Victoria (Australia)
Companies based in Melbourne